Leptobrachium tengchongense is a species of frogs in the family Megophryidae from the Gaoligong Mountains of Tengchong County, Yunnan, China.

References

tengchongense
Frogs of China
Amphibians described in 2016